Mousa  ( "moss island") is a small island in Shetland, Scotland, uninhabited since the nineteenth century. The island is known for the Broch of Mousa, an Iron Age round tower, and is designated as a Special Protection Area for storm-petrel breeding colonies.

Geography

Geologically beds of hard sandstone alternate with muddy limestones that weather to produce fertile soil. A quarry provided flagstones for Lerwick.

Mousa's fertile soil supports a rich diversity of plants, including sheep's-bit and creeping willow in the herb-rich grassland, despite the wind, salt spray and grazing by sheep.

The Norse tended to consider an island to be something that they could circumnavigate, and this included being able to drag a boat over land. Thus Mousa was considered two islands, namely North Isle and South Isle.

Mousa lies directly on the 60th parallel, 60 degrees north of the equator, 30 degrees south of the north pole.

History

Mousa Broch is the best preserved Iron Age fortification in the British Isles. The 2000-year-old round tower stands above a rocky shoreline, one of a pair of brochs guarding Mousa Sound. They may be part of a chain of brochs in this part of Shetland, visible from each other as beacons. The other of the "pair", at Burland on the Mainland is far less well preserved. Many brochs were the focus of a settlement, but there has never been a full archaeological investigation to confirm this at Mousa. It was cleared out in 1860 and 1919. Mousa has survived intact to such a height and is thought to never have been much higher than it is today. It escaped stone gathering for nearby stone walls and croft houses (now ruined).

Mousa is mentioned in the Orkneyinga Saga as being used as a place of defence during invasions, as well as a lovers' hideout.

The entrance passage into Mousa is long, reflecting the enormous thickness of its walls. At its base the broch is 15m in diameter, but the interior is only 6m in diameter. Within the huge thickness of the base of the walls are a range of chambers probably used for storage, while at higher levels passages run between the inner and outer skins of the wall. On the inside a steep flight of steps leads to the top of the wall. Halfway up is a landing which probably gave access to an upper level of the interior of the broch, built on a ledge running around the circumference of the interior.

In July 1558, two Scottish ships from Aberdeen, the Meikle Swallow and Little Swallow, attacked an English fleet off Shetland. The Scottish sailors took cattle and other goods belonging to Olave Sinclair on Mousa. Sinclair claimed compensation in the Edinburgh courts.

Conservation

Mousa is known for grey and common seals, black guillemots, Arctic terns and storm-petrels.

Mousa holds c. 6,800 breeding pairs of European storm-petrels in total. This represents about 8% of the British population and 2.6% of the world population. The island is designated as both a Special Protection Area (SAC) and a Site of Special Scientific Interest (SSSI) by NatureScot, and is run as a reserve by the RSPB.

The seas surrounding the island are host a population of sandeel that provides a food source for many species fish, seabirds, seals, whales and dolphins: the area is considered to have the most reliable population of sandeels of all the seas surrounding Shetland. These seas are therefore also protected, forming both a Special Area of Conservation (SAC) and a Nature Conservation Marine Protected Area (NCMPA).

Storm petrels may also be found at the reserve of Haaf Gruney.

Transport
The island is readily accessed using the passenger-only ferry which operates from the Shetland Mainland at Leebitton, Sandwick in summer time.

See also

 List of islands of Scotland

Footnotes

Sites of Special Scientific Interest in Shetland
Special Protection Areas in Scotland
Uninhabited islands of Shetland
Special Areas of Conservation in Scotland
Royal Society for the Protection of Birds reserves in Scotland
Nature Conservation Marine Protected Areas of Scotland